USS B-1 (SS-10) was the lead ship of her class of submarines built for the United States Navy in the first decade of the 20th century.

Description
The B-class submarines were enlarged versions of the preceding Plunger class. They displaced  on the surface and  submerged. The B-class boats had a crew of one officer and nine enlisted men.

For surface running, they were powered by one  gasoline engine that drove the single propeller shaft. When submerged the propeller was driven by a  electric motor. The boats could reach  on the surface and  underwater.

The B-class boats were armed with two 18 inch (450 mm) torpedo tubes in the bow. They carried two reloads, for a total of four torpedoes.

Construction and career
B-1 was laid down by Fore River Shipbuilding Company in Quincy, Massachusetts, under a subcontract from Electric Boat Company of New Suffolk, Long Island, as Viper, making her the third ship of the United States Navy to be named for the viper.

Viper was launched on 30 March 1907 sponsored by Mrs. Lillian Spear, wife of Lawrence York Spear, Vice President of the Holland Torpedo Boat Company. The boat was commissioned on 18 October 1907. She reported to the Second Submarine Flotilla, Atlantic Fleet.

Service history
Viper cruised along the Atlantic coast on training and experimental exercises until going into reserve at Charleston Navy Yard on 30 November 1909. Recommissioned on 15 April 1910, she served with the Atlantic Torpedo Fleet until assigned to the Reserve Torpedo Group at Charleston Navy Yard on 9 May 1911. On 17 November, her name was changed to B-1.

In April 1914, B-1 was towed to Norfolk, Virginia, and later loaded aboard the collier  for transport to the Philippine Islands. Arriving at Olongapo, Luzon on 24 March 1915, B-1 was launched from the deck of Hector on 15 April and recommissioned two days later.

B-1 was assigned to the First Submarine Division, Torpedo Flotilla, Asiatic Fleet on 19 May 1915 and later served with the Second Submarine Division in Manila Bay's Naval Base Manila. On 1 December 1921, B-1 was decommissioned at Cavite, Philippine Islands, and subsequently used as a target.

See also
USS B-3
USS B-2

Notes

References

External links

United States B-class submarines
World War I submarines of the United States
Ships sunk as targets
Shipwrecks in Manila Bay
Ships built in Quincy, Massachusetts
1907 ships
Maritime incidents in 1922